The 2017 FC Taraz season is the 9th successive season that the club will play in the Kazakhstan Premier League, the highest tier of association football in Kazakhstan, and 24th in total.

Season events
On 4 January, Taraz announced the appointment of Vait Talgayev as their new manager, replacing Yuriy Maksymov.

Despite originally being relegated at the end of the 2016 season to the Kazakhstan First Division, Taraz were re-instated to the Premier League on 3 February 2017, when the Football Federation of Kazakhstan ruled that Altai Semey did not meet the required entry requirements for the Premier League, and would be replaced by Taraz.

Squad

Transfers

Winter

In:

Out:

}

Summer

In:

Out:

Competitions

Kazakhstan Premier League

Results summary

Results by round

Results

League table

Kazakhstan Cup

Squad statistics

Appearances and goals

|-
|colspan="14"|Players away from Taraz on loan:
|-
|colspan="14"|Players who left Taraz during the season:

|}

Goal scorers

Disciplinary record

References

External links
Official site

FC Taraz seasons
Taraz